Duan Qifeng (born 20 January 1973) is a Chinese male former track and field athlete who specialized in the triple jump.

Duan has had a vision impairment since a very young age, which allowed him to also compete in the Paralympics in category T12/F12 events.

Career
His international career flourished in 1998, when he was gold medallist at the 1998 Asian Athletics Championships, silver medallist behind Sergey Arzamasov at the 1998 Asian Games, and a representative for Asia at the 1998 IAAF World Cup.

In the 1998 season he won the national title at the Chinese Athletics Championships with a mark of  – the first athlete to jump over seventeen metres at the competition in eight years. He had been runner-up at the Chinese National Games for his native Hebei previously, finishing second to Zou Sixin in 1993 and Lao Jianfeng in 1997.

Duan Qifeng also competed in the 2004 Summer Paralympics where he won three medals.  He won gold in the F12 triple jump and a bronze in the F12 long jump, he was also part of the gold medal winning Chinese 4 × 100 m relay team.

International competitions

National titles
Chinese Athletics Championships
Triple jump: 1998

References

External links
 
 

1973 births
Living people
Sportspeople from Handan
Runners from Hebei
Chinese male sprinters
Chinese male long jumpers
Chinese male triple jumpers
Visually impaired sprinters
Visually impaired long jumpers
Visually impaired triple jumpers
Paralympic sprinters
Paralympic long jumpers
Paralympic triple jumpers
Paralympic athletes of China
Paralympic gold medalists for China
Paralympic bronze medalists for China
Paralympic medalists in athletics (track and field)
Athletes (track and field) at the 2004 Summer Paralympics
Medalists at the 2004 Summer Paralympics
Asian Games silver medalists for China
Asian Games medalists in athletics (track and field)
Athletes (track and field) at the 1998 Asian Games
Medalists at the 1998 Asian Games